A number of ships have been named Don Carlos.

, Finnish car carrier
MV Don Carlos, formerly New Zealand sealift ship , operated by Spanish company Contenemar SA between 1998 and 2009
, 2006 post Panamax containership operated by CMA CGM

See also
Don Carlos (disambiguation)

Ship names